Elizabeth Anne Lloyd CBE (born 1971) served as Deputy Chief of Staff for Prime Minister Tony Blair's last administration (2005-2007).

Early life
Lloyd attended Guildford Grammar School (others include former Government minister James Purnell, and communications manager Tim Allan) and Clare College, Cambridge, where she graduated with a BA in Law and History in 1993.

Political career 
LLoyd began working for Tony Blair when he became Labour Leader in 1994.  After Blair became Prime Minister in 1997, she became his home-affairs advisor.  She later worked in the Foreign Policy area in the Number 10 Policy Unit  'the powerhouse of New Labour ideas" . She held a number of key coordinating roles in Number 10, and became Deputy Chief of Staff in 2005 with responsibility for much of the domestic policy agenda.

After politics 
In 2007 she joined Standard Chartered and was later appointed Group Head of Public Affairs. Standard Chartered is a London based bank with a focus on Asia, Africa and the Middle East. From 2013 to 2015 she was CEO of Standard Chartered Bank Tanzania.  In 2015 she was elected Vice-Chair of the Tanzanian Bankers Association. She is now based in London and holds the position of Group Company Secretary at Standard Chartered.

Private life 
During her early years in politics her partner was the Labour leader Ed Miliband. Married in 2002 she departed No. 10 in 2005 when pregnant with her first child, She now has two children. Lloyd was made a CBE in the 2008 New Year's Honours list.

Lloyd became a trustee of The Tony Blair Governance Initiative charity in 2009. and later became Chair of Trustees.

References 

Living people
Alumni of Clare College, Cambridge
British political consultants
Labour Party (UK) officials
British special advisers
1971 births